Perenniporia medulla-panis is a species of poroid fungus in the family Polyporaceae. It is a plant pathogen that infects stone fruit trees. The species was first described by Nikolaus Joseph von Jacquin in 1778. Marinus Anton Donk transferred it to the genus Perenniporia in 1967.

References

Fungi described in 1778
Fungi of Europe
Fungal tree pathogens and diseases
Stone fruit tree diseases
Perenniporia